The 1975 Miami Redskins football team was an American football team that represented Miami University during the 1975 NCAA Division I football season. In their second season under head coach Dick Crum, the Redskins won the Mid-American Conference (MAC) championship, compiled an 11–1 record (6–0 against MAC opponents), outscored all opponents by a combined total of 306 to 141, defeated South Carolina, 20–7, in the Tangerine Bowl, and were ranked #12 in the final AP Poll. The team's sole loss was to Michigan State by a 14–13 score in the second game of the season.

The team's statistical leaders included Sherman Smith with 729 passing yards and 1,002 rushing yards, Rob Carpenter with 1,142 rushing yards, and Steve Joecken with 293 receiving yards.

Schedule

References

Miami
Miami RedHawks football seasons
Mid-American Conference football champion seasons
Citrus Bowl champion seasons
Miami Redskins football